Act III may refer to:

Companies, publications and brands
 Act III Broadcasting, a defunct American television broadcasting company
 Act III Theatres, an American movie theater chain acquired in 1998 by Regal Entertainment Group
 Act III Publishing, a defunct American Trade Magazine publisher active 1985-1991
 Act III Communications, an American media and communications company
 Wyeth Act-3, a drug composed of 'ibuprofen'; see Ibuprofen brand names
 LGP-30#ACT-III_programming_language, Librascope ACT-III programming language

Music

Albums
 Act III (Death Angel album), 1990
 Act III (The Seldom Scene album), 1973
 Act III: Life and Death, an album by The Dear Hunter, 2009
 Act Three (G4 album), an album by G4, 2006

See also 
 Act (drama), a division or unit of a drama
 Act II (disambiguation)